Tony Clark (born December 31, 1971) is a North Dakota Republican politician who served as a Public Service Commissioner from 2001 until 2012 when he was appointed to the Federal Energy Regulatory Commission.

Biography
He is a graduate of Fargo North High School, and an alumnus of both NDSU and UND. He was elected to the Public Service Commission of the U.S. state of North Dakota in 2000, and was re-elected in 2006. Prior to being elected Public Service Commissioner, Clark served in the cabinet of Governor Ed Schafer as North Dakota Labor Commissioner, and was the Administrative Officer for the state Tax Department. He is a former state legislator, representing Fargo's District 44 in the state House of Representatives from 1994 to 1997. Clark is married to Amy, and has three children. TOM 
On Jan. 23, 2012, President Barack Obama nominated Clark to a vacant seat on the five-member Federal Energy Regulatory Commission in Washington. He would fill a Republican seat available following the resignation of Mark Spitzer of Arizona. Under federal law, FERC is made up of three members of the president'
s political party and two of the opposition party, with the chairman appointed by the president.

Notes

External links

North Dakota Public Service Commissioners
1971 births
Living people
North Dakota Labor Commissioners
Republican Party members of the North Dakota House of Representatives
North Dakota State University alumni
University of North Dakota alumni
People from Platteville, Wisconsin